Sally Jane Wade (born 13 July 1984) is an English–born football player who plays for the Welsh national team and Beaconsfield Town Women. Wade plays as a defender or midfielder and has accumulated almost twenty caps for Wales.

Club career
Wade attended Chalfonts Community College then moved to America to play varsity soccer while attending Southwest Baptist University. After three successful seasons with The Bearcats, Wade moved to Kennesaw State University for a final season of college soccer in 2005.

After returning to England, Wade played for and captained Watford. She signed for FA Women's Premier League National Division newcomers Barnet in 2010. In March 2011 Wade scored the winning penalty as Barnet won the FA Women's Premier League Cup, beating Nottingham Forest after a 0–0 draw in the final at Adams Park.

Wade signed for Holyport F.C in 2017 making 38 appearances and scoring 10 goals.

In 2023, Wade signed for Beaconsfield Town F.C

International career
Wade made her international debut for Wales, aged 23, in a 1–1 friendly draw in Portugal in January 2008. She was eligible for to play for Wales via her Welsh grandmother.

Personal life
Wade works as a Cardiac Physiologist at Wycombe Hospital.

References

External links
Sally Wade at UEFA
Sally Wade at FAW

1984 births
Living people
Watford F.C. Women players
Wales women's international footballers
FA Women's National League players
Footballers from Hillingdon
Kennesaw State University alumni
Southwest Baptist University alumni
Southwest Baptist Bearcats women's soccer players
Kennesaw State Owls women's soccer players
Barnet F.C. Ladies players
Welsh women's footballers
Women's association football defenders
Women's association football midfielders